James Flint was a British and Australian architect. A number of his works are heritage-listed.

Early life 
Flint was born in 1862 in Eppleworth, Hull, Yorkshire, England, the son of James Flint .

Architectural career 
Flint was articled to the Manchester firm of architects and building surveyors, Sherwood and Peverley. He had then moved to London and practiced there for a period of about eighteen months. Following this period of work, Flint emigrated, arriving in Victoria in December 1883, and entered into partnership with Mr Horsley in Melbourne.

In 1887 he moved to Rockhampton to practice as an architect and surveyor. He took up offices in Central Chambers in East Street. At this time he and John William Wilson were the main architects active in Rockhampton. In the booming economy of Rockhampton and Mount Morgan Flint designed several notable buildings.

Politics 
Flint was also a member of the Rockhampton Municipal Council, as well as the Central Separation League, the lobby group pushing for separation of Central Queensland as an independent state.

Later life 
James Flint died on 6 January 1894 at Rockhampton from heart disease. He was buried in South Rockhampton Cemetery on 7 January 1894.

Significant works 
His significant works (known and attributed) include:
 Criterion Hotel (1888-9) 
 Yungaba Migrant Hostel (1890)
 Rockhampton Club (1892)
 Kenmore House (circa 1894)

References

Attribution 

1862 births
1894 deaths
19th-century Australian architects
Articles incorporating text from the Queensland Heritage Register